The 2007–08 George Mason Patriots men's basketball team began their 42nd season of collegiate play on November 9, 2007 at the Patriot Center versus Vermont.  George Mason won the 2008 CAA tournament and advanced to the 2008 NCAA tournament.  The Patriots were awarded a #12 seed, but lost in the first round to Notre Dame.

Season notes
 On February 20, 2008, Coach Jim Larranaga earned his 400th career victory.
 On January 19, 2008, Junior guard Dre Smith set an NCAA Division I record for most 3 point field goals made without a miss (10).
 On December 21, 2007, it was announced that freshman guard Jay Threatt was released from his basketball commitment and will seek a transfer from the university.
 On December 18, 2007, it was announced that senior forward Darryl Monroe will take a medical redshirt for the 2007–2008 season and will maintain his last year of eligibility for the 2008–2009 season.

Awards

First Team All-CAA
 Will Thomas

Second Team All-CAA
 Folarin Campbell

CAA All-Defensive Team
 Will Thomas

CAA Player of the Week
 Will Thomas – Nov. 19
 Will Thomas – Nov. 26
 Dre Smith – Jan. 21
 Folarin Campbell – Feb. 11

CAA Rookie of the Week
 Cam Long – Jan. 14

Roster

Stats

Game log

|-
!colspan=12 style=| Non-conference regular season

|-
!colspan=12 style=|<span style=>CAA regular season

|-
!colspan=12 style=|CAA tournament

|-
!colspan=12 style=|NCAA tournament

Recruiting
The following is a list of players signed for the 2008–09 season:

References

George Mason
George Mason Patriots men's basketball seasons
George Mason
George Mason
George Mason